Thomas Clarke (November 19, 1911 – February 14, 1969) was a British skeleton racer who competed in the late 1940s. He finished ninth in the skeleton event at the 1948 Winter Olympics in St. Moritz.

References
1948 skeleton results
Skeletonsport.com results
Thomas Clarke's profile at Sports Reference.com

1911 births
British male skeleton racers
1969 deaths
Skeleton racers at the 1948 Winter Olympics
Olympic skeleton racers of Great Britain